Luke Guldan (born March 26 in Wisconsin) is an American model and actor, best known for his role as Chris Baker in NBC's The Good Place, as well as Billy in the CBS All Access series Tell Me a Story.

Early life
Guldan was born in Milwaukee and raised in Brooklyn, New York. He went to Fort Hamilton High School in Bay Ridge, Brooklyn.

Career
“Tell Me A Story” follows the world's most beloved fairy tales that are re-imagined as a dark and twisted psychological thriller set in modern-day New York City. The first season of this serialized drama interweaves "The Three Little Pigs”, "Little Red Riding Hood," and "Hansel and Gretel" into an epic and subversive tale of love, loss, greed, revenge, and murder. Luke plays ‘Billy’ and stars alongside Paul Wesley, James Wolk, and Kim Cattrall. The series premiered on CBS All Access on October 31, 2018.

Luke’s additional TV credits include Broad City, Law and Order: Special Victims Unit, Blue Bloods, Gossip Girl, The Good Place, and The Colbert Report.

On the silver screen, Luke can next be seen in the upcoming feature films “Fluidity”, "Final Frequency”, and “The Creatress” opposite Fran Drescher. Luke was recently seen in the indie films “The Broken Ones”, “ADDicted”, “The Watermen” and “Rockaway”.

On the stage, Luke received rave reviews as the lead, Benjamin Braddock, in the Ivoryton Playhouse's theatrical adaptation of “The Graduate”. He has also appeared in Tennessee Williams’ classic “Street Car Named Desire” and David Storey's critically acclaimed “The Changing Room”.

Guldan has been on the covers of, and featured in, magazines such as Men’s Health, GQ, Men’s Fitness, Muscle & Fitness and Cosmopolitan. Luke was named the NABBA “Mr Teen Empire State” in 2004 and the INBF “Mr Fitness” in 2008 and 2009.

Filmography

References

External links
 

Living people
21st-century American male actors
Male actors from Milwaukee
Male actors from New York City
Year of birth missing (living people)